Kirishi Power Station (Kirishskya GRES) is a thermal power station (GRES) at the town of Kirishi, Kirishsky District, Leningrad Oblast, Russia. The power plant is located adjacent to a larger Kirishi oil refinery. Installed electrical capacity of the power station reached 2595 MW after completion of modernization program for unit 6 in 2011, which included installation of two gas turbines for this unit to utilize combined cycle with total increase of capacity 500 MW and efficiency 20%. The heating capacity is 1,234 Gcal/h.

References 

Natural gas-fired power stations in Russia
Power stations built in the Soviet Union
Chimneys in Russia